The 2nd Kansas Cavalry Regiment was a cavalry regiment that served in the Union Army during the American Civil War.

Service
The 2nd Kansas Cavalry was organized at Kansas City, Kansas beginning on November 8, 1861, but its designation was changed to 9th Kansas Infantry on February 4, 1862. It was changed again on March 5, 1862, to 2nd Kansas Cavalry. It was mustered in under the command of Colonel Alson C. Davis.

The regiment was attached to Department of Kansas November 1861 to August 1862. 2nd Brigade, Department of Kansas, to October 1862. 2nd Brigade, 1st Division, Army of the Frontier, Department of Missouri, to February 1863. District of Southwest Missouri, Department of Missouri, to December 1863. 2nd Brigade, District of the Frontier, to January 1864. 2nd Brigade, District of the Frontier, VII Corps, Department of Arkansas, to March 1864. 1st Brigade, District of the Frontier, VII Corps, to April 1864. 3rd Brigade, District of the Frontier, VII Corps, to January 1865. 2nd Brigade, 3rd Division, VII Corps, to February 1865. Unattached, VII Corps, to August 1865.

On May 22, 1862, an order was received from District Headquarters for the 2nd Kansas Cavalry to provide a 150-man detail to man a battery of six 10-pdr Parrott rifles at Fort Leavenworth. This battery became known as Hopkins' Battery and remained in service until August 1, 1862. Some officers were ordered to return to the regiment, while the remaining men were mounted and ordered to reinforce Major General Don Carlos Buell in northern Alabama. This detachment ultimately participated in the Kentucky Campaign, saw minor action at the Battle of Perryville and captured a rebel flag and 24 prisoners at Lancaster, Kentucky, in a skirmish there. These men returned to the regiment by January 1, 1863.

The 2nd Kansas Cavalry mustered out of service on August 17, 1865.

Casualties
The regiment lost a total of 181 men during service; 2 officers and 62 enlisted men killed or mortally wounded, 1 officer and 116 enlisted men died of disease.

Commanders
 Colonel Alson C. Davis
 Colonel Robert Byington Mitchell
 Colonel Samuel Johnson Crawford
 Lieutenant Colonel Owen A. Bassett

Notable members
 Colonel William F. Cloud - Namesake of Cloud County, Kansas.
 Captain Avra P. Russell, Company K - Namesake of Russell County, Kansas, died of wounds received at the Battle of Prairie Grove, Arkansas.
 Sergeant Marion Harper, Company E - Namesake of Harper County, Kansas, killed at Waldron, Arkansas
 Private William D. Mitchell, Company K - Namesake of Mitchell County, Kansas, promoted to captain of a Kentucky regiment, killed at the Battle of Monroe's Crossroads, North Carolina
 Private Vincent B. Osborn, Company A - Namesake of Osborne County, Kansas, lost a leg at Roseville, Logan County, Arkansas

See also

 List of Kansas Civil War Units
 Kansas in the Civil War

Notes

References
 Dyer, Frederick H.  A Compendium of the War of the Rebellion (Des Moines, IA:  Dyer Pub. Co.), 1908.
 Official Military History of Kansas Regiments During the War for the Suppression of the Great Rebellion (Leavenworth, KS:  W. S. Burke), 1870.
Attribution

External links
 History of the 2nd Kansas Cavalry by the Museum of the Kansas National Guard

Military units and formations established in 1861
Military units and formations disestablished in 1865
Units and formations of the Union Army from Kansas
Artillery units and formations of the American Civil War